Fernando Ferreira can refer to:

 Fernando Ferreira (boccia), Portuguese Paralympic medalist in boccia
 Fernando Ferreira (cyclist) (born 1952), Portuguese cyclist
 Fernando Ferreira (footballer) (born 1986), Portuguese footballer
 Fernando Ferreira (high jumper) (born 1994), Brazilian high jumper

See also
 Fernando Fonseca (born 1997), full name Fernando Manuel Ferreira Fonseca, Brazilian footballer
 Fernanda Ferreira (disambiguation)